opened in Midorigaoka Park, Obihiro, Hokkaidō, Japan in 1991 as the fifth annex of Hokkaido Museum of Modern Art. The collection focuses on works by artists from eastern Hokkaidō as well as those of the Barbizon school.

See also
 List of Cultural Properties of Japan - paintings (Hokkaidō)
 List of Historic Sites of Japan (Hokkaidō)
 Obihiro Centennial City Museum

References

External links

 Hokkaido Obihiro Museum of Art  
 Hokkaido Obihiro Museum of Art 

Art museums and galleries in Hokkaido
Prefectural museums
Obihiro, Hokkaido
Museums established in 1991
1991 establishments in Japan